The 437th Operations Group (437 OG) is an active United States Air Force unit. It is the flying component of the Eighteenth Air Force 437th Airlift Wing, stationed at Charleston Air Force Base, South Carolina.

The unit's World War II predecessor unit, the 437th Troop Carrier Group was a C-47 Skytrain transport unit assigned to Ninth Air Force in Western Europe. During the Normandy campaign, the group released gliders over Cherbourg and carried troops, weapons, ammunition, rations, and other supplies for the 82nd Airborne Division in Operation NEPTUNE. For these actions, the group received a Distinguished Unit Citation.

Overview
The 437 OG is responsible for flying the C-17 Globemaster III jet cargo aircraft, the newest aircraft in the AMC airlift system.

Units
The group consists of the following units:
 14th Airlift Squadron
 15th Airlift Squadron
 16th Airlift Squadron
 437th Operations Support Squadron

History
 For additional lineage and history, see 437th Airlift Wing

World War II
From May–December 1943, the 437th Troop Carrier Group trained with C-47 Skytrain cargo planes in Indiana, Missouri, and North Carolina. In January 1944, the group deployed to England, where it prepared for the invasion of Nazi-occupied Europe. During the Normandy campaign, the group released gliders over Cherbourg Naval Base and carried troops, weapons, ammunition, rations, and other supplies for the 82nd Airborne Division in Operation Neptune. For these actions, the group received a Distinguished Unit Citation.

The air echelon deployed to Italy in July 1944 and participated in the Allied invasion of southern France in August 1944 dropping paratroops of the 1st Airborne Task Force. During Operation Market Garden in September 1944, the group released gliders carrying troops and equipment for the airborne attack in the occupied Netherlands. In December 1944, the group re-supplied the 101st Airborne Division in the Bastogne area of Belgium during the Battle of the Bulge. After moving to France in February 1945, the unit released gliders in support of an American crossing of the Rhine River called Operation Varsity in March 1945. The 437th continued to supply the offensive forces in April, while also evacuating wounded personnel to rear-zone hospitals. After V-E Day, the group evacuated prisoners of war and displaced persons to relocation centers. The group then returned to the United States and was inactivated.

Cold War
Trained as a reserve unit until August 1950, when it was ordered to active duty because of the outbreak of war in Korea and later moved to Japan in November 1950. Between December 1950 and June 1952, the group airlifted ammunition, rations, aircraft parts, gasoline, and other war supplies from Japan to United Nations bases in Korea, while evacuating wounded troops from Korea to hospitals in Japan. During 1951, the 437th also dropped paratroops and flew re-supply and reinforcement missions in support of the Eighth Army in Korea. Between January–June 1952, the group transported battlefield replacements and evacuated troops on leave. From June 1952 – November 1957, the group again served as Reserve training organization flying C-46s.

Modern era
Activated as part of Objective Organization adoption by 437 AW in October 1991. Assumed control of operational squadrons. Routinely deployed aircraft and aircrews in support of humanitarian and contingency operations in the Balkans, Southwest Asia, Africa, Russia, and provided disaster relief support, 1992–2001. Supported Global War on Terrorism contingencies from October 2001–.

Lineage
 Established as 437 Troop Carrier Group on 15 April 1943
 Activated on 1 May 1943
 Inactivated on 15 November 1945
 Redesignated 437 Troop Carrier Group, Medium, on 10 May 1949
 Activated in the Reserve on 27 June 1949
 Ordered to active duty on 10 August 1950
 Inactivated on 10 June 1952
 Activated in the Reserve on 15 June 1952
 Inactivated on 16 November 1957
 Redesignated: 437 Military Airlift Group on 31 July 1985 (Remained inactive)
 Redesignated: 437 Operations Group on 24 September 1991
 Activated on 1 October 1991.

Assignments

 I Troop Carrier Command, 1 May 1943
 50th Troop Carrier Wing, February 1944
 53d Troop Carrier Wing, 17 February 1944
 50th Troop Carrier Wing, 10 July 1945
 U.S. Forces European Theater, 18 July 1945

 I Troop Carrier Command, 6 August 1945
 IX Troop Carrier Command, 4–15 November 1945
 437th Troop Carrier Wing, 27 June 1949 – 10 June 1952; 15 June 1952 – 16 November 1957
 437th Airlift Wing, 1 October 1991–present

Stations

 Baer Field, Indiana, 1 May 1943
 Sedalia Army Air Field, Missouri, 8 June 1943
 Pope Field, North Carolina, 10 October 1943
 Baer Field, Indiana, 29 December 1943–c. 12 January 1944
 RAF Balderton (AAF-482), England, January 1944
 RAF Ramsbury (AAF-469), England, 5 February 1944
 Air echelon deployed to: Montalto Di Castro Airfield, Italy, July–August 1944
 Air echelon deployed to: RAF Chilbolton (AAF-404), England, 1–6 September 1944

 Coulommiers-Voisins Airfield (A-58), France, 24 February – 28 July 1945
 Baer Field, Indiana, 15 August 1945
 Marfa Army Airfield, Texas, 14 September – 15 November 1945
 Chicago-Orchard Airport (later, O'Hare Field-Chicago International Airport), Illinois, 27 June 1949
 Shaw AFB, South Carolina, 14 August – 16 October 1950
 Brady Air Base, Japan, 8 November 1950 – 10 June 1952
 O'Hare International Airport, Illinois, 15 June 1952 – 16 November 1957
 Charleston AFB, South Carolina, 1 October 1991–present

Components
 14th Airlift Squadron: 1 April 1992–present
 15th Airlift Squadron: 1 October 1993–present
 16th Airlift Squadron: 1 October 1993 – 29 September 2000; 1 July 2002–present
 17th Airlift Squadron: 1 October 1991 – 25 June 2015
 20th Airlift Squadron: 1 October 1991 – 1 October 1993
 36th Airlift Squadron: 1 December 1991 – 1 October 1993
 76th Airlift Squadron: 1 October 1991 – 1 October 1993
 41st Tactical Airlift Squadron: 1 October 1991 – 1 April 1992
 83d Troop Carrier Squadron (T2): 1 May 1943 – 15 November 1945; 27 June 1949 – 10 June 1952; 15 June 1952 – 16 November 1957
 84th Troop Carrier Squadron (Z8): 1 May 1943 – 15 November 1945; 27 June 1949 – 10 June 1952; 15 June 1952 – 16 November 1957
 85th Troop Carrier Squadron (90): 1 May 1943 – 15 November 1945; 27 June 1949 – 10 June 1952; 15 June 1952 – 1 July 1957
 86th Troop Carrier Squadron (5K): 1 May 1943 – 15 November 1945; 27 June 1949 – 1 August 1950; 26 January 1951 – 10 June 1952.

Aircraft

 C-47 Skytrain, 1943–1945
 C-53 Skytrooper, 1943–1945
 C-109 Liberator Express, 1945
 CG-4A Waco, 1943–1945
 Horsa glider, 1944

 C-46 Commando, 1949–1952; 1952–1957
 C-119 Flying Boxcar, 1951
 C-141 Starlifter, 1991–2000
 C-17 Globemaster III, 1993–present

References

 Maurer, Maurer (1983). Air Force Combat Units of World War II. Maxwell AFB, Alabama: Office of Air Force History. 
 Johnson, David C. (1988), U.S. Army Air Forces Continental Airfields (ETO), D-Day to V-E Day; Research Division, USAF Historical Research Center, Maxwell AFB, Alabama.
 437th Operations Group

External links

Operations groups of the United States Air Force